Agyneta tincta is a species of sheet weaver found in the Comoro Islands. It was described by Jocque in 1985.

References

tincta
Spiders of Africa
Spiders described in 1985